Qarah Qeshlaq (also Romanized as Qarah Qeshlāq and Qareh Qeshlāq; also known as Kara-Kishlak and Qara Qishlāq) is a village in Sanjabad-e Gharbi Rural District, in the Central District of Kowsar County, Ardabil Province, Iran. At the 2006 census, its population was 338, in 73 families.

References 

Tageo

Towns and villages in Kowsar County